Manti is a city in and the county seat of Sanpete County, Utah, United States. The population was 3,276 at the 2010 United States Census.

Description
Manti was the first community in Utah to be settled outside the Wasatch Front and served as the hub for the formation of many other communities in Central Utah.  The Manti Utah Temple, the fifth temple built by the Church of Jesus Christ of Latter-day Saints is found in Manti and dominates the area's skyline. Manti formerly hosted the Mormon Miracle Pageant for two weeks each summer.

History

Manti was one of the first communities settled in what was to become Utah. Chief Walkara (or Walker), a Ute Tribe leader, invited Brigham Young to send pioneers to the area to teach his people the techniques of successful farming. In 1849, Brigham Young dispatched a company of about 225 settlers, consisting of several families, to the Sanpitch (now Sanpete) Valley. Under the direction of Isaac Morley and George Washington Bradley, the settlers arrived at the present location of Manti in November. They endured a severe winter by living in temporary shelters dug into the south side of the hill on which the Manti Temple now stands. Brigham Young named the new community Manti, after a city mentioned in the Book of Mormon. Manti was incorporated in 1851. The first mayor of Manti was Dan Jones. Manti served as a hub city for the settlement of other communities in the valley.

Relations with the local Native Americans deteriorated rapidly, and the Walker War soon ensued. The war consisted primarily of various raids conducted by the Native Americans against Mormon outposts in Central and Southern Utah. The Walker War ended in the mid-1850s in an understanding negotiated between Brigham Young and Wakara. Shortly after that, Welcome Chapman and Wakara oversaw the baptism of scores of Wakara's tribe members. Although immediate hostilities ended, none of the underlying conflicts were resolved.

In 1865 Utah's Black Hawk War erupted when an incident between a Manti resident and a young chieftain exploded into open warfare between the Mormon settlers and the local Native Americans. Forts were built in Manti and other nearby communities. Smaller settlements in the area were temporarily abandoned for the duration of the war. In the fall of 1867, Chief Black Hawk made peace with the settlers, but sporadic violence occurred until 1872, when federal troops intervened. Many Mormon settlers who fought and died in the wars are buried in the Manti Cemetery. Most of the Utes were eventually relocated to the Uintah and Ouray Indian Reservation in Eastern Utah.

Geography
According to the United States Census Bureau, the city has a total area of 2.0 square miles (5.1 km2), all land.

Manti has a humid continental climate (Köppen Dfb) with warm summers and cold winters, receiving on average barely enough rainfall to avoid a semi-arid classification (BSk). Its high elevation means that the climate is cooler than other populated areas of Utah, especially during summer. Summers highs average in the mid-80s°F, with winter highs in the mid-30s°F. Winter lows, however, dip to around 15–20 °F. Pacific storms move through the region from October through May and spring is the wettest season. However, summer, which is the driest season, primarily relies on precipitation from scattered diurnal thunderstorm activity and the Gulf of California monsoon. Winter and spring see frequent snowfall. Precipitation averages 12.70 inches and snowfall 52.2 inches. The record high temperature is 110 °F (43 °C), set on August 6, 1895, while the record low is −27 °F (−33 °C), set on January 22, 1937.

Although Utah as a whole only averages 2–3 tornadoes per year, Manti was hit directly by an F2 tornado on September 8, 2002. The tornado was on the ground for 15 minutes and managed to cause $2 million in damage as it tore through southeastern Manti. No one was injured or killed in the incident.

Demographics

As of the census of 2000, there were 3,040 people, 930 households, and 742 families residing in the city. The population density was 1,560.2 people per square mile (601.9/km2). There were 1,010 housing units at an average density of 518.3 per square mile (200.0/km2). The racial makeup of the city was 96.48% White, 0.07% African American, 1.58% Native American, 0.07% Asian, 0.43% Pacific Islander, 0.49% from other races, and 0.89% from two or more races. Hispanic or Latino of any race were 2.60% of the population.

There were 930 households, out of which 46.7% had children under the age of 18 living with them, 68.0% were married couples living together, 9.7% had a female householder with no husband present, and 20.2% were non-families. 18.8% of all households were made up of individuals, and 11.6% had someone living alone who was 65 years of age or older. The average household size was 3.25 and the average family size was 3.74.

In the city, the population was spread out, with 38.1% under the age of 18, 10.6% from 18 to 24, 20.6% from 25 to 44, 17.6% from 45 to 64, and 13.2% who were 65 years of age or older. The median age was 26 years. For every 100 females, there were 97.8 males. For every 100 females age 18 and over, there were 91.1 males.

The median income for a household in the city was $32,844, and the median income for a family was $37,163. Males had a median income of $30,156 versus $22,500 for females. The per capita income for the city was $12,677. About 11.4% of families and 13.0% of the population were below the poverty line, including 16.0% of those under age 18 and 7.8% of those age 65 or over.

Education
Manti is located in the South Sanpete School District and has one elementary school, as well Manti High School, who have the Templars as their mascot and compete in the 3A level of competition (out of five levels). Middle school students attend in nearby Ephraim.

Notable people
 William Harrison Folsom (1815-1901), architect and designer of the Manti Temple
 Julia Christiansen Hoffman (1856–1934), artist and arts patron, Portland, Oregon
 Ed "Big Daddy" Roth, Hot-Rod art, customizing and pinstriping, notable for Rat Fink

See also

 List of cities and towns in Utah
 Ephraim, Utah

References

External links

 The Official Manti City website
 Mormon Miracle Pageant
 Historic Old City Hall – a tourist information center, local history museum, and social hall
 John Patten DUP Museum – a historic house museum run by the Manti chapter of the Daughters of Utah Pioneers

 
Cities in Utah
Cities in Sanpete County, Utah
County seats in Utah
Populated places established in 1849
1849 establishments in the State of Deseret